Minuscule 836 (in the Gregory-Aland numbering), Θε46 (von Soden), is a 14th-century Greek minuscule manuscript of the New Testament on paper. The manuscript has not complex contents, it lacks Gospel of Luke.

Description 
The codex contains the text of the Gospel of Matthew, Gospel of Mark, and Gospel of John on 277 paper leaves (size ). The text is written in one column per page, 33 lines per page.
The headpieces are in red.

It has some notes at the margin.

It contains a commentary of Theophylact.

Text 
The Greek text of the codex is a representative of the Byzantine text-type. Kurt Aland placed it in Category V.

It was not examined by the Claremont Profile Method.

 Textual variants
 Matthew 1:3b-4a δε εγεννησε τον Αραμ. Αραμ δε εγεννησε τον Αμιναδαβ, Αμιναδαβ δε εγεννησε ] omit
 Matthew 1:24 – διεγερθεις δε ο Ιωσεφ απο ] διεγερθεις δε α απο

History 

C. R. Gregory dated the manuscript to the 14th century. Currently the manuscript is dated by the INTF to the 14th century. The manuscript once belonged to the Convent of S. Marco de Florentia des Predigerordens as minuscule 196.

The manuscript was examined and described by Angelo Maria Bandini. It was added to the list of New Testament manuscripts by Gregory (836e). Gregory saw it in 1886. It was digitized in 2009.

Currently the manuscript is housed at the Laurentian Library (Plutei XI. 18), in Florence.

See also 

 List of New Testament minuscules
 Minuscule 835
 Minuscule 837
 Biblical manuscript
 Textual criticism

References

Further reading 

 Angelo Bandini, Catalogus codicum manuscriptorum graecorum, latinorum, italicorum etc, Bibliothecae Mediceae Laurentianae (Florence 1767-1778), p. 513.
 Pierre Petitmengin – Laetitia Ciccolini, Jean Matal et la bibliothèque de Saint Marc de Florence (1545), "Italia medioevale e umanistica", 46, 2005, pp. 207–238.

External links 
 Biblioteca Medicea Laurenziana Catalogo Aperto
 Images at the Biblioteca Medicea Laurenziana

Greek New Testament minuscules
14th-century biblical manuscripts